Alicia Graf Mack (née Alicia J. Graf, born 1978/1979) is an American dancer and teacher. She danced with Dance Theatre of Harlem and Alvin Ailey American Dance Theater, and taught at Washington University in St. Louis, Webster University, and University of Houston. In 2018, she became the Director of Dance Division at Juilliard School.

Early life
Graf Mack was born in San Jose, California, and grew up in Columbia, Maryland to a white father and black mother who was a professor at Howard University. Graf Mack stated she is distantly related to Russian painter and designer Léon Bakst, who had designed costumes and sets for Ballets Russes. She started dancing at age 3, and competitively at age 12. She studied at a public high school and trained at Ballet Royale Academy, and attended summer intensives at American Ballet Theatre and School of American Ballet.

Career
Whilst a senior in high school, Graf Mack took class with Dance Theatre of Harlem, a predominantly African-American ballet company, and was offered an apprenticeship by the company's founder Arthur Mitchell. She relocated to New York to join the company at age 17 and finished high school with Professional Children's School. She was eventually promoted to soloist.

At age 19, Graf Mack was diagnosed with ankylosing spondylitis, which required surgeries. She left the Dance Theatre of Harlem, then started studying at Columbia University School of General Studies, and graduated with a BA in history. During her study, she interned at JP Morgan on corporate giving and philanthropy. After she graduated, Mitchell offered her a principal dancer contract, so she returned and stayed with the company until it was disbanded in 2004. Graf Mack noted she auditioned at American Ballet Theatre and New York City Ballet, but was told as the female dancer quota was filled and she was too tall.

In 2005, Graf Mack joined Alvin Ailey American Dance Theater, a modern dance company. In her company debut, New York Times wrote that she "was so good she became the news of the night all by herself." However, in 2008, she left due to an injury. She moved to St. Louis, Missouri to study an MA in nonprofit management at Washington University in St. Louis, while teaching ballet and modern dance at Webster University. After she graduated, she joined Webster University as full-time faculty.

In 2011, Graf Mack rejoined the Ailey company, and danced the company premiere of Wayne McGregor's Chroma in 2013. She retired from the company in 2014. She rejoined Webster University, while teaching at Washington University as an adjunct. Three years later, she joined the faculty at University of Houston and was a visiting professor at Webster University.

Graf Mack formed a dance collective, D(n)A Arts Collective, with her sister Daisha Graf, a commercial dancer. As a guest dancer, she had danced with Alonzo King LINES Ballet, and for Beyoncé, John Legend, Andre 3000 and Alicia Keys. She is also a contributor of Pointe Magazine, including the 2014 June/July cover story, which featured Ashley Murphy, Ebony Williams and Misty Copeland, all of whom are African-American ballet dancer.

In 2018, it was announced that Graf Mack would take over as the Director of Dance Division at Juilliard School. She is the first woman of color and youngest person to hold this position. Later that year, following Mitchell's death, she performed a solo Mitchell choreographed on her at his memorial, at Mitchell's request.

Personal life
Graf Mack currently lives in New Jersey with her husband, Kirby Mack, and their two children.

References

1970s births
20th-century American ballet dancers
21st-century American ballet dancers
21st-century American women
African-American female dancers
African-American ballet dancers
American ballerinas
Columbia University School of General Studies alumni
Dance teachers
Dancers from Maryland
Dance Theatre of Harlem dancers
Juilliard School faculty
Living people
Modern dancers
People from Columbia, Maryland
University of Houston faculty
Washington University in St. Louis alumni
Washington University in St. Louis faculty
Webster University faculty